This is a list of rural localities in Penza Oblast. Penza Oblast (Penzenskaya oblast) is a federal subject of Russia (an oblast). Its administrative center is the city of Penza. As of the 2010 Census, its population was 1,386,186.

Locations 
 Bessonovka
 Kondol
 Lopatino
 Malaya Serdoba
 Narovchat
 Neverkino
 Russky Kameshkir
 Vadinsk

See also
 
 Lists of rural localities in Russia

References

Penza Oblast